Humana may refer to:
 Humana Inc., an American health insurance company
 Humana Press, an American publisher
 , a German dairy company
 , a Swiss non-governmental organization
 Humana people, a historic ethnic group of Texas and Mexico
 Numana, historically also Humana, a town in Italy

See also 
 Jumana (disambiguation)